Saint-Martin is a former municipality, now part of the Chomedey neighbourhood of the city of Laval, Quebec, Canada, corresponding roughly to the Roman Catholic parish of Saint-Martin.

The parish church, Église Saint-Martin, is located at 4080, boulevard Saint-Martin. The city of Laval operates Parc Saint-Martin, a public park at 4025, rue Gaboury.

Saint-Martin, a commuter railway station that no longer exists, was also located here.

Education
École Saint-Martin is a French-language high school operated by the Commission scolaire de Laval.

References

Description of Saint-Martin (residential sector) at Commission de toponymie du Québec
Description of Saint-Martin (parish) at Commission de toponymie du Québec
Interactive map of Laval from the official website Shows both the borders and names of the 14 former municipalities (purple) and the borders only of the current 6 sectors (maroon), tick off both boxes beside "Limite administrative".

External links
City of Laval, official website
Unité pastorale Saint-Martin

Neighbourhoods in Laval, Quebec